Stanisław Modzelewski (15 March 1929 – 13 November 1969) was a Polish serial killer known as The Vampire of Gałkówek, active in Łódź, Poland during the 1950s. He completed three classes of primary school and worked in Warsaw as a driver. During 1952-1956 and in 1967, he murdered seven women and attempted to murder six others. Although he is believed to have murdered an eighth victim (which he confessed to), it was never proven as the body was never found. He was sentenced to death and the execution by hanging was carried out in November 1969, in Warsaw.

Modus operandi
Modzelewski murdered women between the ages of 18 and 87 by strangling them with a scarf or with his bare hands. He took valuables as well as useless objects from his victims which he then threw away. He executed them with utmost cruelty. The murders also had a sexual motive. The lower part of the victims' bodies were nude and the arrangement of the corpse suggested a penetration of genital organs. Modzelewski was a sadist but it was not verified whether he tortured the victims before or after the murder.

Victims
The list contains names of the confirmed victims of Modzelewski, place of murder, cause of death, and the approximate date of murder 
Józefa Pietrzykowska (67) a forest in Zielona Góra near Gałkówek, strangled with bare hands, July 1952
Maria Kunka (32) a forest near Tuszyn, strangled with a scarf, December 1952
Teresa Piekarska (21) a field by the forest in Nowy Józefów, strangled with a scarf, March 1953
Irena Bernadetta Dunajska (24) a field near the road in Gałkówek, strangled with a scarf, January 1955
Helena Walos (18) the vicinity of a country road near the forest in Gałkówek, strangled with a scarf, March 1956
Helena Klata (22) the vicinity of a road near the rail track between Andrzejów and Gałkówek, strangled with a scarf or bandanna (a fragment of material was left on the victim's neck), August 1956
Maria Gałecka (87) a flat on Sienna Street in Warsaw, strangled or drowned (the corpse stuck out of the bathtub, the buttocks were exposed and cut with a sharp tool), 14 September 1967

Investigation
The investigation of the Vampire of Gałkówek's murders was discontinued in 1957. Despite the thoroughness of the investigation, the perpetrator was not found as the police were  led astray from the beginning. They assumed that the murderer was a Polish State Railways employee as the crimes were committed near the railway track and some of the women who managed to survive stated that the offender was wearing a uniform. As a result, the perpetrator was not found and the local people continued to live in fear.

10 years later the case was reopened because of the murder in Warsaw. The suspect in the killing of Maria Gałecka was soon found. It was Stanisław Modzelewski, her ex-neighbor and he was known to have had a number of disputes with the victim.

See also
Capital punishment in Poland
List of serial killers by country

External links
Modzelewski in Polish

Sources

1929 births
1969 deaths
1952 murders in Poland
1967 murders in Poland
1950s murders in Poland
1960s murders in Poland
20th-century Polish criminals
Executed people from Podlaskie Voivodeship
Executed Polish serial killers
Male serial killers
People convicted of murder by Poland
People executed by Poland by hanging
People executed by the Polish People's Republic
People from Łomża County
Polish people convicted of murder
Polish rapists
Violence against women in Poland